Sherilyn Williams-Stroud has been active in the field of geology for over three decades, where she has been recognized as one of the most important women in the field.  In terms of representation in STEM (science, technology, engineering and mathematics), the field of geosciences is of the least diverse, and throughout her career she has been paving the way for women, ethnic minorities, members of the LGBTQ community as well as other communities to nullify that underrepresentation. Williams-Stroud attended Oberlin College where she studied geology and graduated in 1981. She earned both her master's degree in geology (1984) as well as her PhD in structural geology (1988) from Johns Hopkins University. Although her work is dedicated to sedimentology, geophysics and geochemistry, she does have particular areas of expertise in fracture modelling, stress and strain analysis, rock fracture mechanics with applications to oil and gas production and exploration, geothermal energy, evaporite sedimentology, geochemistry and other resources. After a long career in developing knowledge of such diverse topics in geoscience, Williams-Stroud created her own company Confructus, Inc.  It is here that she consults clients within the field of oil and gas on various topics such as assessments regarding any geological risk towards projects. Williams-Stroud is an active member of several professional organizations as well as a leading activist of the Black Lives Matter movement.

Early life 
Williams-Stroud's early life began when she graduated from the University City Senior High in Missouri. She received her BA in geology from Oberlin College, MA in geology and PhD in the field of geosciences from Johns Hopkins University. She then later began her first job as a research geologist at the United States Geological Survey in 1988.

As an African-American woman she has been striving for gender and race diversity in the field of geosciences and is now an advocate for the Black Lives Matter movement. Williams-Stroud is also a part of the National Association of Black Geologists and Geophysicists; where she has been a member for the last 25 years.

Career 

Williams-Stroud is currently the president and CEO of Confractus, Inc. as well as a research geologist for the Illinois State Geological Survey. Sherilyn is also an associated expert of the TerraEX group, for which she has conducted various geological workshops including "Fractured, Fracturing, and Fracked Reservoirs" in 2019 and "Fracked Reservoir DFN Modeling: Fracture Analysis and Modeling with Induced Microseismicity Data" in 2020. Throughout her career Sherilyn has been very involved in the oil and gas industry, working with companies such as Occidental Oil, Texaco, and Chevron.

The following table gives the history of Sherilyn's contributions to geology and science by listing her past and present occupations:

Legacy 
Williams-Stroud has contributed to several articles about how microseismic monitoring can benefit the process of hydraulic fracking which results in the ability to drill or frack in order to obtain the most oil or gas (microseismic monitoring research). She has helped develop a method to estimate accurate plane fracture plane size using rock lithology and microseismic event source information. This information was used to help see the possible fractures through qualitative representations. She is also responsible for overseeing geological interpretation and the integration of microseismic geological and geomechanical analysis of well simulation.

In 2016 Williams-Stroud delivered guest lecture at the University of Nairobi to inspire young geologists of African American descent to enter the field and alter the diversity.

Williams-Stroud is also an active member of AAPG (American Association of Petroleum Geologists), (SPE) Society of Petroleum Engineers, (SEG) Society of Exploration Geophysicists, (NABGG) National Association of Black Geologists and Geophysicists, (EAGE) European Association of Geoscientists and Engineers, (NASEM) National Academies of Sciences, Engineering, and Medicine.      

Her current projects and research includes:
Decator Project, ( sequestration)
Low cost geothermal energy development and utilization
Geological storage of nuclear waste
Integrating induced seismic results with subsurface geological data interpretation

Publications

References 

Living people
Women geologists
Oberlin College alumni
Johns Hopkins University alumni
Year of birth missing (living people)